Muhlenberg School, also known as Bishop Miller Tabernacle Church, is a historic school building located in the Feltonville neighborhood of Philadelphia, Pennsylvania.  It was built in 1874–1875, and is a two-story, cross-gabled stone building, six bays wide and three bays deep.  It is in the Italianate-style.

It was added to the National Register of Historic Places in 1988. It is a contributing property to the Lower North Philadelphia Speculative Housing Historic District.

References

School buildings on the National Register of Historic Places in Philadelphia
Italianate architecture in Pennsylvania
School buildings completed in 1875
Historic district contributing properties in Pennsylvania
North Central, Philadelphia